The Cathedral Basilica of St. Mary also called the Catholic Cathedral of the Assumption, is the cathedral church of the Latin Diocese of Oradea Mare. It is located in the city of Oradea, northwest Romania.

The basilica was built between 1752 and 1780, and was designed by Italian architect Giovanni Battista Ricca (1691-1757). After the death of the first architect, construction was completed by the Viennese Franz Anton Hillebrandt and the church was adorned with baroque decorations of Austria.

See also
Roman Catholicism in Romania

References

O
Buildings and structures in Oradea
O
O
O
Historic monuments in Bihor County
18th-century Roman Catholic church buildings in Romania